Stéphanie Pakenham (born 29 November 1990) is a Canadian female badminton player. In 2016, she won the gold medal in the mixed team event at the Pan Am Badminton Championships. In the individual event, she won the silver medal in the women's singles event.

Achievements

Pan Am Championships
Women's singles

Women's doubles

References

External links 
 

1990 births
Canadian female badminton players
Living people
Sportspeople from Quebec City
Laval Rouge et Or athletes